Wu (Hao)-style t'ai chi ch'üan was created by Wu Yuxiang (birth name Wu Heqing, 1812?–1880?), a member of a wealthy and influential family in Yongnian, Hebei, China. Wu trained for approximately ten years with the founder of Yang-style t'ai chi, and then for over a month with a Chen-style master. Wu also obtained a manual on internal martial arts that formed the core of what are now known as the T'ai Chi Ch'üan Classics and include Wu's own writing on the subject. From these sources Wu and his family developed their own style, and may also have developed much of the cultural and intellectual foundation of t'ai chi ch'üan as well.

Hao Weizhen (1849–1920), birth name Hao He, was a disciple of Wu's nephew and was the first person outside the family to master their t'ai chi. Hao's contributions — in developing and spreading the art, and in training the founders of all subsequent Wu (Hao) lineages, as well as the further contributions of his son and grandson — are why many include his surname alongside or in place of Wu's when referring to this style.

This Wu style (Wǔ) is the third-oldest among the five major styles — Chen, Yang, Wu (Hao), Wu (Wú), and Sun — but is the smallest and least well-known of the five, in part because Wu Yuxiang and his family had no need to teach professionally. It is best known for its small- and medium-frame forms, and its unique approach to developing internal strength and structure.

History

Wu Yuxiang
Wu Yuxiang began training with Yang Luchan (1799–1872), the founder of Yang-style t'ai chi, in the early 1840s after Yang returned to Yongnian from his years in the Chen village. Among their many properties the Wu family were the landlords of Chen Dehu's pharmacy and clinic, where Yang offered instruction in what he then called "soft boxing", "cotton boxing", or "neutralizing boxing". But in the early 1850s, Wu and his family helped Yang obtain a position as a martial arts instructor to palace officials in distant Beijing.

Wu then found his way to Chen Qingping (1795–1868), a master of Chen-style and Zhaobao-style t'ai chi, in Zhaobao village where he trained with Chen for over one month (per writings left by Wu's nephew and grandson). After approximately ten years of training with Yang, Wu was likely able to quickly master a great deal from Chen, gaining further depth and insight.

From this training Wu began to develop his own style, which he shared with members of his extended family. He and his family were wealthy gentry, some of them government officials but none in military careers at that time, and had no need to teach martial arts for professional or financial purposes. They seem to have pursued t'ai chi primarily as a means of self-cultivation, and possibly for self-defense and leadership in a time of widespread civil breakdown and unrest including banditry, anti-landlord uprisings, and the Nian and Taiping rebellions.

The T'ai Chi Ch'üan Classics

In the early 1850s Wu's eldest brother Chengqing (also known as Wu Qiuying, 1800-1884) was serving as a government official in Henan, when he obtained a manual on the principles of internal martial arts. In the writings of the next generation, this was tersely reported as having been received at "a salt shop", with the assumption that any reader would understand the context of that statement. Salt merchants were wealthy and of equal social status with an official like Wu Chengqing. At least one scholar speculates that the owner of that shop may have been a fellow book collector who had learned of the Wu family's interest in the topic, and was seeking to curry favor with Chengqing who among other things was in charge of tax collection.

Authorship of the manuscript was attributed to a Wang Zongyue of Shanxi, about whom no information is available in verifiable historical records. (Some have suggested Wang Zongyue could be a pseudonym of Wu Yuxiang or another Wu family member, but the writing style is different and the mundane salt shop story — as opposed to, say, claiming an immortal sage found it in an enchanted cave — lends believability as well.) Wu Chengqing passed the manual on to Wu Yuxiang, who discussed it with his friend and teacher Yang Luchan. Yang agreed it was important. Over the following years, Wu and his family applied the lessons of this text to the development of their art and created a body of written work around it, which together became known as the first version of the T'ai Chi Ch'üan Classics.

Wu's nephew and top disciple Li Yiyu (1832–1892) contributed several texts to the final collection. Wu's older brothers Chengqing and Ruqing (1803-1887), also wrote on the topic after they retired from government service, though those works along with more by Li Yiyu were not made public until the 1980s and 1990s, so have been called "lost classics". Wu likely also shared his writings with Yang Luchan, and with Yang's son Yang Banhou (1837-1890) who Wu tutored (probably in literacy as well as t'ai chi). Although the Wu and Yang lineages appear to have drifted apart by the next generation, in the early twentieth century Yang Chengfu's disciples began to publish their own versions of these texts with their own additions, and began to call them the "T'ai Chi Ch'üan Classics".

The Name of T'ai Chi Ch'üan

The name "t'ai chi ch'üan" (Pinyin: tàijíquán) may have first appeared in the Wu/Li family's mid-nineteenth century writings, perhaps drawn from the Wang Zongyue text which begins with the words "Taiji is born from Wuji; it is the mother of Yin and Yang". As the Wu family had no need to promote their art, it was left to the Yangs to bring this to the public first. But with different priorities, especially as the two families drifted apart (or worse) by the second generation, they often felt no need to mention each other at all which is why few knew of this.

Yang family tradition tells us only that imperial court scholar Weng Tonghe (Ong Tong) used the term "t'ai chi" in a poem describing a performance by Yang Luchan. It is not clear if that was an additional influence on the name, or if the new name was already in use there, along with the earlier names "Thirteen Postures", "Long Boxing"(), and "Soft/Cotton/Neutralizing Boxing". Written evidence for Yang family adoption of the name "T'ai-chi" first appeared in a later text, possibly completed in 1875 by Yang Luchan's son Yang Banhou (who had been tutored by Wu Yuxiang), or no later than the first decade of the twentieth century by one or more of Banhou's Yang or Wu disciples.

By the second decade of the twentieth century, Yang Chengfu disciples and Sun Lutang were using the term "t'ai chi ch'üan" in their publications, including in the titles of some of the T'ai Chi Ch'üan Classics. It then appeared in a book by a Chen family member, Chen Xin, published after he died in 1929. This timeline may represent the origin and history of the adoption of this name — from Wu to Yang to Wu, then Sun, then Chen — but with no record of verbal usage we have no way of knowing for sure.

The Legend of Zhang Sanfeng

The Wu family wrote of many other connections between the art and traditional Chinese culture, with the writings of eldest brother Wu Chengqing especially showing his interest in Daoism when he was not occupied with his official Confucian responsibilities. Scholars believe Wu Yuxiang passed along to his successors and to the Yang family the story of the creation of internal martial arts by legendary Daoist alchemist Zhang Sanfeng.

For Wu Yuxiang and the seventeenth century authors he likely drew from, that story may have been primarily an anti-Manchu political allegory. There is no mention of Zhang in original Chen village documents, and although Wu's nephew and disciple Li Yiyu did write about Zhang, in a later piece written in 1881 Li stated "The creator of Taijiquan is unknown".

But with Wu Yuxiang most likely having planted the seeds of this tradition, supplementary chapters on internal martial arts attributed to Zhang were appended to the above-mentioned work by Yang Banhou or his disciples, and by the early twentieth century publications by Yang Chengfu's disciples and Sun Lutang proclaimed Zhang Sanfeng creator of t'ai chi ch'üan itself. In Yang style editions Zhang was also named as author of one of the T'ai Chi Ch'üan Classics.

Li Yiyu and Hao Weizhen

"Wu Yuxiang taught reading as a hobby, and Li Yiyu practiced medicine as a profession. They both considered themselves to be members of the literati, and in their hometown taught very few students. Li’s best student was his neighbor, Hao He, known by the courtesy name Weizhen." - Gu Liuxin

Wu Yuxiang practiced his t'ai chi with his older brothers, and his only disciples were his nephews Li Yiyu and Li Qixuan (Simplified Chinese , 1835-1899). Li Yiyu became a prominent voice speaking to us from the past through his writing on t'ai chi, and he was the first to teach this style to anyone outside the family. Wealthy and occupied for many years with establishing and running a smallpox clinic, he devoted much of his spare time to practicing, researching, and further developing the art with his uncle Yuxiang and brother Qixuan, but also took on as a disciple his neighbor Hao He (1849–1920), known by the courtesy name Hao Weizhen, for whom he made one of only three handwritten copies of the Wu/Li family t'ai chi manual.

Hao Weizhen became a well-known master and professional instructor, further refining the art and developing his own solo form (see the Characteristics section below). Closely associated with the martial arts community in Hebei, including Yang Zhaolin (1884-1922) the eldest grandson of Yang Luchan, beginning in 1914 he also taught in Beijing where his students included Sun Lutang (1860-1933) the founder of Sun-style t'ai chi, and in Yongnian that same year Hao led the first t'ai chi ch'üan program in a public school. Hao's contributions — in developing and spreading the art, and in training the founders of all subsequent Wu (Hao) lineages, as well as the further contributions of his son and grandson — are why many include his surname when referring to this style.

Lineage
The Wu (Hao) lineage is represented today by at least a dozen branches with many smaller offshoots. The four largest branches are listed here, named for the purposes of this article as follows:
 Li family branch
 Hao family branch
 Li Shengduan branch
 Li Baoyu (Li Xiangyuan) branch

The founders of these branches trained under Hao Weizhen, but the first branch in the list traces lineage directly back to the original Wu and Li families. Li family descendants still teach, but no direct descendant of the Wu or Hao families has a leading role in the art today.

Although Sun style is considered a descendant of Wu (Hao) style because the founder learned t'ai chi ch'üan from Hao Weizhen, that style is covered in a separate article and not included here.

Lineage tree

Li family branch

This branch uses the name "Wu Style Taijiquan", sometimes spelled "Wuu" in translation to indicate the pronunciation. Some have referred to it as "Li Frame" or "Northern Branch", and we discuss those names below, but members of this lineage do not use those labels themselves today. They also do not include the name Hao because their lineage includes family bonds to the original Li and Wu families, but Hao Weizhen did help train founder Li Xunzhi (1882–1944). Xunzhi was ten years old when his father Li Yiyu died, and so completed his training under his elder brothers and his elder "martial brother" Hao Weizhen.

Li Xunzhi's sons were key disciples, including Li Jinfan (Simplified Chinese , 1920-1991), and the lineage continued on through his grandsons and other family members, but among his most well-known disciples were also Wei Peilin (1913-1961) and Yao Jizu (Simplified Chinese, 1917-1998).

Wei was rising to prominence with the National Sports Commission before he died while still in his forties. Yao led prominent t'ai chi organizations and schools, and published many books and articles, including  (The Complete Book of Wu Style Taijiquan), which covers this lineage's forms and other training practices. That serves as their core handbook, supplemented with books and articles by fifth generation grandmaster Zhai Weichuan (1942-) and others, including Zhai's book  (Wu Style 37-Posture Taijiquan) on the simplified form he developed for busy beginners. This lineage has continued to develop shorter forms, including a 28-posture routine, consistent with trends and standards in the field. They generally practice in middle frame, with small frame training for advanced students.

Grandmaster Zhai was a disciple of Wei Peilin until Wei died, and then became a disciple of Yao Jizu. Zhai is currently the president of the Yongnian Yuxiang Taiji Research Institute, headquartered in Yongnian with branches in Hangzhou, Tianjin, Shijazhuang, and other places in China, and has taught in many more locations nationwide. His son Zhai Shizong is managing director and a master instructor there.

In 1999 Zhai Weichuan founded a 1,000-student primary school centered around t'ai chi. Tens of thousands of adult t'ai chi students have also participated in his training programs, including groups from abroad, and he has accepted 140 formal disciples. In 2020 he appeared in the film submitted by China to place t'ai chi on the UNESCO Intangible Cultural Heritage List, representing the "Wuu" style.

Zhong Zhenshan (钟振山, 1949-), another fifth generation grandmaster, is perhaps better known in the West than most representatives of this lineage. Born in Yongnian, he became disciple of Yao Jizu at age 13. He has written over twenty articles on taijiquan, and assisted Yao Jizu in compiling  (The Complete Book of Wu Style Taijiquan). With others of his lineage generation, he  helped develop the Wu-style competition and simplified forms. Winner of several gold medals in t'ai chi contests, he was appointed general instructor for a thousand-person t'ai chi performance, and has been officially recognized for his accomplishments. He has trained many disciples and students in China, and has led workshops and advised Wu-style organizations in North America as well.

This lineage practices a 108-posture empty-hand form, as well as simplified and competition forms, sword and staff forms, push hands, and other aspects of the art. More about forms and partner work is in the Characteristics section.

Hao family branch

In the past this branch often used the name "Wu Style Taijiquan", with some attempts to clarify by calling it "Hao Frame" or "Hao School", resulting in longer locutions like "Wu Style Hao Family Taijiquan". But over time the trend has been to call it "Wu (Hao) Taijiquan" or even simply "Hao Family Taijiquan". The branch was founded by Hao Weizhen's son Hao Yueru (1877-1935) and grandson Hao Shaoru (1907-1983), who brought the art from Yongnian to the Nanjing region and Shanghai in 1930, at a time when many martial artists followed the Chinese government and economy to those areas.

They also made changes to their art consistent with developments happening in many t'ai chi styles and other martial arts at the time, to bring the benefits of t'ai chi to a wider range of people. Building on the form created by his father Hao Weizhen, Hao Yueru developed a 96-posture small frame form and his son Hao Shaoru developed a shortened 49 posture version of the same form, both designed to be accessible to people who practice t'ai chi primarily for health, while still offering a martial core with lessons on internal power and other advanced aspects of the art to intermediate and advanced students. This lineage is known for their focus on the internal aspects of "Yi" ("Intention") and "Qi" ("Energy") in martial applications.

Hao Shaoru paused his public t'ai chi teaching in the 1950s, but was invited by the government to lead a new class in Shanghai in 1960, and in 1963 published the seminal book Wu Style Taijiquan which focused on the 96-movement form. Liu Jishun (Simplified , 1930-), also known as Jackson Liu, became the second student in that 1960 class. Also a master of tui na and other aspects of traditional Chinese medicine, Liu continued training with Hao Shaoru until Hao's death in 1983 (though they practiced separately for a few years during the Cultural Revolution), and in 1981 Liu was selected by Hao Shaoru to begin representing the lineage alongside top artists from other t'ai chi styles at events in Yongnian and elsewhere.

Grandmaster Liu trained a new generation of disciples and other students in China, serving as vice president and then president of the Shanghai Wu Style Taijiquan Research Association in the 1980s. He also accepted disciples from the United Kingdom, including the head of the British Jingwu Athletic Association, Jifu Huang (1935-1995), and two more UK disciples who have in turn trained several British national push hands champions and founded Hao-style schools in the UK and Singapore. In 1995 Liu moved to the United States, where he founded the Wu (Hao) Taiji Association of Silicon Valley and trained several disciples there. In 2005 he retired to the San Diego area, where he continued to teach tui na and t'ai chi, and in 2008 and 2012 two English/Chinese books on the Hao family style were issued under his name by a Hong Kong martial arts publisher.

Other Hao Shaoru disciples and students include Pu Gongda (1905-1997), a lifelong martial artist who began training with Hao Shaoru in the 1960s, established the Shanghai Wu Style Taijiquan Research Association with Hao in 1983 and served as president of the organization, and trained thousands of students including British and Americans; Hao's adopted son Li Weiming (1944-), also a master of tui na and traditional Chinese medicine, who began training with Hao Shaoru in 1961 and now teaches in Shanghai and Bangkok; and Hao's adopted son Hao Yinru (1958-), who changed his name from Wang Muyin and now teaches in Shanghai. In 1991 Hao Yinru wrote a new foreword to a new edition of Hao Shaoru's book,  (Wu Style Taijiquan).

In addition to the 49- and 96-posture small frame forms, advanced students in this lineage also learn the old form of Hao Weizhen in small frame, as well as staff/pole training, straight sword, push hands, and other aspects of the art. More about forms in the Characteristics section.

Li Shengduan branch

This branch currently uses the name "Wu (Hao) Tai Chi" or "Wu Hao Tai Chi Chuan". The founder, Li Shengduan (Simplified Chinese , 1888-1948), of Xingtai, Hebei, was a disciple of Hao Weizhen and was an accomplished scholar. Descended from China's Hui people, he was not related to Li Yiyu. His most prominent disciples were Ma Rong (1912-1965), Chen Gu'an (1913-1993), and Wu Wenhan (1928-2019).

A scholarly lineage from the start, Li's disciples authored many books and articles on t'ai chi and related subjects, in addition to training many disciples and students of their own. Chen Gu'an wrote a book on the 108-posture form he standardized for this lineage and another on the Wu (Hao) style staff. Wu Wenhan wrote a book on Wu (Hao)-style applications and a comprehensive collection of classic works on t'ai chi — from Li Yiyu's copy of the Wang Zongyue classic through major early twentieth century writers of all t'ai chi styles — as well as over 200 articles on the history and theory of the art.

Wu Wenhan also researched and released in 1993 previously unknown works by Wu Yuxang's eldest brother Wu Chengqing. Those texts, along with other "lost classics" by Li Yiyu, Wu Ruqing, and Yang Banhou first revealed to the public between 1985 and 1993, expanded our understanding of the original history and thought of the founding generations and the T'ai Chi Classics.

This lineage continues to thrive in China, and is represented worldwide by Texas-based Grandmaster Jimmy K. Wong (Wang Guoqiang, Wong Kokkhang), a disciple of Chen Gu'an and Wu Wenhan. Their schools practice a small frame 108-posture long form standardized by Chen Gu'an plus several small frame simplified forms, as well as straight sword, saber, staff, and other aspects of the art. More about forms in the Characteristics section.

Li Baoyu (Li Xiangyuan) branch

Focused on the old form of Hao Weizhen, most masters in this lineage call their art "Hao-style Taijiquan". The branch was founded by Li Baoyu (Simplified Chinese , 1888-1961), who was also known by the courtesy name Li Xiangyuan (Simplified Chinese ). Li was a native of Shunde in what is now Xingtai, Hebei, and was not related to Li Yiyu. Beginning at age 14 he trained under Liu Yingzhou in San Huang Pao Chui, and then as an adult studied Yang Banhou t'ai chi ch'üan under Yang Luchan's eldest grandson Yang Zhaolin (1884-1922), before mastering Wu (Hao) style as a disciple of Hao Weizhen.

Small and slightly built, Li Baoyu surprised many challengers, defeating all opponents in and out of the ring including several gangsters. Thrust into a hardscrabble life at an early age, martial arts provided strength and stability, and his prowess earned him the nickname "Spirit Hand Li". He established a flour milling business and raised a family, but his many storied martial adventures continued on throughout his life. His most famous student was Dong Yingjie. He coached Dong through a nationally celebrated victory against a British boxer in Nanjing — as the story goes, Li was originally slated to fight that match, but a Chinese gangster working for the British consul temporarily blinded him by throwing lime powder in his eyes — and then taught in Suzhou, Hangzhou, Nanjing, Hebei, Shanxi, and elsewhere, his fame attracting requests for training even from the central government.

Known for his Vajra Palm, T'ai Chi Yin Wind Palm and Extend Peng Draw Lü Rotation techniques, he trained several disciples, including Shi Fengchun, Li Wanquan, and his good friend the Daoist adept Li Jianxing who was also a master of traditional Chinese medicine. Li Baoyu's daughter Li Guihua, also a disciple, collaborated on a manual of their Hao style and on a novel about the heroic exploits of her father and his friends that includes the story of intrigue surrounding the famous match in Nanjing.

His disciples established teaching lineages in Hebei and Shanxi, and on the national stage his disciple Ouyang Fang represented Wu (Hao)-style in an official 1977 government film of the major t'ai chi styles, performing the Hao Weizhen form. Li Baoyu's friend and student Dong Yingjie included that form, along with fast forms Dong developed in part by incorporating postures and principles he learned from Li, in the advanced curriculum of Dong family tai chi taught today in over twenty countries around the world. More about these forms is in the Characteristics section below.

The rectification of (branch) names

"When Wu Style Taijiquan spread to Beijing in the first years of the Republic, some people called it 'Li frame', then when Weizhen’s son Yueru and grandson Shaoru went to teach in Nanjing and Shanghai in 1928, people also called it 'Hao frame'." - Gu Liuxin

As the Hao family began to spread this style to the public, some confusion resulted. When Hao Weizhen traveled to Beijing in 1914 to teach his middle frame form, he humbly presented himself as a disciple of Li Yiyu. But in 1930 when his son and grandson moved to the Nanjing and Shanghai areas to teach their unique small frame forms, they were more forward about taking credit. And so the Wu-style form created by Hao Weizhen was sometimes called "Li frame", while the next-generation Wu-style forms created by his descendants were called "Hao frame".

Some also attempted to clarify this by referring to the Li family lineage as the "Northern" branch, and schools of the Hao family beginning with Hao Yueru as the "Southern" branch, though for much of their lives they were all based in Hebei. The other lineages founded by the unrelated masters surnamed Li were also sometimes lumped together as "Northern".

Those terms are seldom used today. The Li family lineage has long since committed to using only the name "Wu Style", while the other branches began using variations such as  "Wu Hao Style" and "Hao Style" more often over time, as described in the above sections on Lineage. The topic of Northern and Southern Chinese martial arts generally refers to a much broader geography and time frame than the early twentieth century context of Beijing vs. Nanjing/Shanghai, and in that wider context all styles of t'ai chi are considered "Northern".

Characteristics
Wu Yuxiang's style is unlike Chen style, old or new frame, and unlike Yang style, large or small frame. After he learned those styles, he created a new system that offers these unique points: compact postures, slow relaxed movements, and footwork that strictly and clearly distinguishes empty and solid. Chest and belly are kept neutral in advancing, retreating, and turning, completely relying on the internal movement between empty and solid to transform and dominate external forces with "internal qi and hidden change". — Gu Liuxin

Compact frame

T'ai chi styles are often categorized by their "frame size", which describes how far the body is extended for small, medium, or large overall reach. Wu (Hao) is practiced primarily in small and middle frame. In describing small frame, Gu Liuxin wrote "the left and right hands each control half the body; they do not cross the center line, and they do not extend beyond the tips of the feet". Medium frame is, of course, midway between that and the fully extended large frame.

Wu (Hao) began as a middle frame style, and the Li family lineage continues to practice primarily in middle frame, though they also train advanced students in small frame as well.

The Hao family lineage is known for their small frame. Their forms and other practice focus on small frame movements, including the old form of Hao Weizhen which they modified for small frame practice.

The Li Shengduan lineage also focuses on small frame practice, while the Li Baoyu lineage teaches the old form of Hao Weizhen and advanced techniques in middle frame.

Traditional and simplified forms

Wu (Hao)-style forms have undergone five stages of development since the nineteenth century, and since the third generation have often been called "kai he" forms in reference to their focus on "opening and closing" movements.

First- and second-generation Forms

The earliest written records we have of this style's forms are in Li Yiyu's own hand. In 1881 he recorded a first-generation form consisting of 53 to 55 postures, the count varying as he worked to improve the description. He and his brother Li Qixuan continued working on improvements to the training for the rest of their lives, developing a second-generation 67-posture form. The larger total resulted from separately counting subpostures, such as left and right versions of the same posture, and some additional postures.

Among other core tai chi principles, opening and closing movements were emphasized in this style from the beginning, however in the first two generations' forms those were referred to not as "kai he" ("open and close"), but with a literary term, "zhuan he" (. Some have continued to use that older phrase; see the Comparisons section below for more detail on this topic).

Third generation: the Kai He form

Li Yiyu's top disciple Hao Weizhen created a form that is taught as a sequence of 81 to 88 postures. Hao was the first to use the term "kai he", or "opening and closing", in reference to specific movements in this form, drawing from Li Yiyu's writing on theory (discussed further below). As a result, this has often been called "the Kai He Form" and at times the entire style has been called "Kai He t'ai chi ch'üan". This is the oldest Wu (Hao) form still widely practiced today, and as performed in many schools is still representative of the early forms with its middle frame and its more overtly martial aspects, including many postures with the torso slightly forward-inclined (in line with the rear leg), visible nei jin (internal strength and structure), fa jin (explosive energy), several low postures, and jumps including a jump kick. However, some lineages have since modified certain aspects of this form to align with their curriculums.

In 1914 when Hao Weizhen first taught in Beijing, this form was performed in about eight or nine minutes, the same speed at which Yang Chengfu and Wu Jianquan were timed doing their own long forms that decade in largely the same sequences we know today. All these forms were performed at a varying slow-swift tempo then, usually with jumps and fa jin. The 1977 film of Li Baoyu disciple Ouyang Fang's performance of this form is like a time capsule for us, with few if any changes from the original he'd begun learning almost fifty years before. In the early twentieth century, t'ai chi forms were still intended for martial artists who also spent long hours each day training on individual moves and their applications, often after years of experience in other martial arts.

Yang Chengfu and Wu Jianquan modified their primary training forms to a slow even speed, removing jumps and fa jin, to make the art more accessible for the health of the broader public with the encouragement of government officials. But Hao Weizhen's form retained speed, jumps, and fa jin for decades, because the next generations developed other forms to meet the new goals.

The Li Baoyu lineage has preserved this form relatively unchanged, as documented in the 1998 book 郝式太极拳 (Hao Style Taijiquan) written in collaboration with Li Baoyu's daughter Li Guihua. It is practiced with some minor variations among schools in Hebei and Shanxi, where it is taught at the original nine-minute pace and at a slower training pace of about fourteen minutes, but only in the worldwide Dong family t'ai chi sub-branch is the focus primarily on a slowed down and smoothed out pattern. That version retains the evident internal strength and structure that has led the Dong lineage to call this their "Hard Form" (in contrast to their primary Yang form), and it still includes some fa jin moves. They perform it in about eighteen minutes, giving advanced students time to focus on the unique Wu (Hao)-style internal training it offers, because this is the only Wu (Hao) form in the Dong curriculum. But in those schools it is supplemented with Dong family fast forms, which include sections that incorporate techniques and principles Dong Yingjie learned from Li Baoyu, in the old slow-swift tempo.

The Hao family lineage later modified this form in one significant respect as well: they made it a small frame form, to align it with their next-generation forms. Their version is outwardly a bit less martial in appearance, yet it retains vigorous features including speed, a jump kick, and fa jin. It is taught to advanced students, and although Grandmaster Liu Jishun stated in a 1999 interview that it is taught at a fourteen-minute pace, he also published a DVD in 2005 showing that once mastered it can still be performed in less than nine minutes or even under five minutes.

Fourth generation: new traditional forms

In the first half of the twentieth century the forms got longer still, but with a change in focus: creating routines for the broader public and not just for martial artists.

The first was Hao Yueru's 96-movement small frame form. Gu Liuxin gave these examples of changes in that form: "Originally there were also jumping movements until the fourth generation teacher Hao Yueru (1877-1935) removed them. The 'Double-Slap Swinging Lotus' was also changed so that there is no slapping of the top of the foot. These were adaptations made for the needs of the old and infirm."

Accessible to "the old and infirm", yes, and Hao Shaoru did say it was a "qigong quan", but it still contains a martial arts core, with lessons on the applications of internal strength and other topics for intermediate and advanced students. The Hao family lineage is known for their focus on "Yi" ("intention") as well as "Qi" ("energy"), with masters demonstrating the use of their small and seemingly soft movements to launch opponents into the air and across the room just as well as masters of other lineages often do.

Next were two 108-movement routines. Like the Hao Yueru 96 form, these are now considered the traditional long forms of their respective lineages.

The Li family lineage (as we have named them for the purposes of this article), under Wei Peilin, Yao Jizu, and others, standardized a 108-posture form that is still middle frame, but slightly less extended, and higher, softer, and more hidden than the previous generations' forms, with the torso more vertical, and no jump kicks or other immediately strenuous movements. Advanced students are introduced to fa jin movements and other aspects of internal strength in the form, and also learn to practice in small frame as well as a "paochui" version with more fa jin.

In the Li Shengduan lineage, Chen Gu'an standardized another 108-movement form in a small frame approach that, as with the others of this generation, is accessible to a wider range of people yet contains martial training for intermediate and advanced students. This is the traditional long form taught today by Jimmy K. Wong and other disciples of that lineage, with a focus on internal strength and structure.

Fifth generation: simplified and competition forms

The era of shortened / simplified Wu (Hao) forms began in the mid-twentieth century with Hao Shaoru's 49-movement routine. Requiring only about 10 minutes to perform, as compared to approximately 25 minutes for the full 96-movement version, it is taught to beginners and used for public demonstrations.

Wu (Hao)-style masters were not included in the development of the 24-movement Simplified Form published in 1956, which was composed entirely of Yang-style postures, nor the 48-movement Combined Form of 1976 which included postures from Chen-, Yang-, Wu- (Wú), and Sun-style and was later condensed into the 42-movement Competition Form in 1989.

But in 1995 a Wu (Wǔ)-style 46-movement Competition Form was finalized by a committee led by (as we have named them for the purposes of this article) the Li family lineage. That form was formally published and officially adopted by the national standards committee in 1996. Then in 2006 Zhai Weichuan of the same lineage published his 6-minute 37-movement simplified form to make t'ai chi available to a wider swath of the public. He and his disciples have since developed shorter forms, including a 28-posture routine, consistent with national trends and standards.

Meanwhile the Li Shengduan lineage, led abroad by Jimmy K. Wong, has developed simplified forms in 36, 32, 24, 13, and 8 movements. These are similar in length to new short forms developed by other styles at the behest of China's national standards committees.

Weapons forms and partner routines

Wu (Hao)-style weapons forms include, with some variation among the lineages and individual schools, straight sword (Pinyin: jiàn), saber/broadsword (Pinyin: dāo), and long pole (gǎn). Although spear methods (Pinyin: qiāngfǎ,) are mentioned in a 19th-century manual by Li Yiyu, they are seldom practiced today. However the pole forms and drills for one and two persons include many spear-like movements, similar to the sticking and thrusting pole practice of the Yang and Chen styles, but without the many rotations of Chen-style spear forms.

These forms share many other similarities with Yang-style weapons forms, and may be closely related. In some Hao family schools the straight sword form is almost exactly the same as the Yang-style version. In the Li family lineage, although their straight sword form is a different sequence, their two-person saber set is quite similar to a set practiced by some Yang-style branches and may be related via Yang Banhou. This is worthy of more research.

Partner work includes stationary and stepping push hands (tuīshǒu), as well as freestyle grappling (sàndǎ). Further discussion of push hands theory is in the Comparisons section below. As mentioned above there are also two-person weapons sets for saber and staff.

The 13 Important Points

The T'ai Chi Classics of the Wu (Hao) style include a list of thirteen important points for every practitioner to keep in mind. Wu Yuxiang compiled the first eight, the "body methods" (shēnfǎ), while Li Yiyu added the final five "essentials" (Simplified , yāolǐng). All Wu (Hao) lineages agree on the importance of this list for each and every movement, though some list them in a slightly different order. Following is a translation of the list as taught by Liu Jishun, grandmaster of the Hao family lineage.

Comparisons: Chen and Yang (and the origin of Kai He)

Wu (Hao)-style t'ai chi is based on principles shared with other styles, especially Yang style. For example, Yang Chengfu's "Ten Essential Points" are quite similar to the Wu (Hao)-style "Thirteen Important Points" listed above, and in fact Wu Yuxiang has been named as the source of the Yang essential points list by some writers in the Yang-style lineage. Chen-style masters also teach these essentials with a few additional points, most notably the concept of internal spiral energy paths.

Like Yang-style, Wu (Hao)-style focuses on "pulling silk" (chōusījìn) rather than the Chen-style "reeling silk" (chánsījìn), and Wu (Hao) shares with Yang the focus on "sinking qi to the dantian" rather than the Chen emphasis on dantian rotation. But all t'ai chi styles contain all of these principles, varied only by emphasis.

Other points of comparison include the many posture names and sequences in the empty-hand forms that are shared with Yang style and a few with Chen style, and the similarities with Yang-style weapons forms noted above, as well as similarities and differences on fundamental principles such as the Wu (Hao) style's focus on shifting and sinking vs. the Yang style's focus on shifting and twisting, though both styles contain all of those internal principles, just as all styles require the practitioner to clearly distinguish between "empty and solid" (xūshí) weighting during those movements.

Shared principles aside, much of the Wu (Hao) approach is evidence of an independent evolution and can provide a new perspective for students of other styles. For example, in their forms where Yang stylists perform their signature moves of Commencing (qǐshì) and Stroke Peacock's Tail's "péng lǚ jǐ àn", the Wu (Hao) forms instead perform Commencing and Lazily Bind the Cloak (lǎn zā yī). In name that would seem to derive from the Chen style, but in this style that sequence is different from both Yang and Chen, with a unique approach to internal alignment.

Beginning with Hao Weizhen, the internals of those movements have been named as: 

and these can also be applied to every posture in the form.

Furthermore, Yao Jizu taught that all t'ai chi movements contain these principles: 

This is not to say that Wu (Hao)-style masters haven't from the beginning also taught the four directions "péng lǚ jǐ àn" and the four corners "cǎi liè zhǒu kào", at least in the context of pushing hands, as they have for example in the Pushing Hands Ditty transmitted by Li Yiyu, in Wu Chengqing's recommendation to begin partner training with, as the Wu (Hao) style calls them, péng, lōu, and zhǒu, and Hao Weizhen's mention of pushing hands in his advice to Sun Lutang, through more recent works such as Yao Jizu's chapter on pushing hands which shows the continued importance of the four directions and four corners by beginning with a basic push hands set in the pattern of "péng, lōu, zhǒu, àn".

Yet for Wu (Hao) stylists, the most fundamental concept is "kai he". Other styles of tai chi and other internal martial arts also give attention to the importance of opening and closing in all movements, but Li Yiyu was the first to specifically call it kai he in his "Treatise on the Diagram of Substantial/Insubstantial and Opening/Closing",  and Wu (Hao) masters have uniquely made this concept their central focus.

It took some time for Li's terminology to be adopted, however. The first two generations both called the internal aspects of Commencing and Lazily Bind the Cloak by the terms "qǐ chéng zhuǎn hē", with "zhuǎn" meaning "to turn", "to change direction", or "to circle about". This is evidence of the origins of Wu (Hao) style with a family of the literati social class, as "qǐ chéng zhuǎn hē" is also the structure of classical Chinese essays required for the imperial examinations, as well as classical poetry. In modern times it has spread across East Asia as the structure of narratives such as screenplays, and is known in Japanese as "Kishōtenketsu".

But when Li Yiyu's student Hao Weizhen began spreading the art to the broader public, he refined his teaching for practical application and for consistency with his master's teachings by replacing "zhuǎn" with "kāi". Since then most masters have used the term "kai he", and in fact at times the entire style has been called "Kai He tai chi ch'üan". However others, including Wu Wenhan of the Li Shengduan lineage, preserved the old terms in their teachings.

The unique focus on "zhuan he" / "kai he" in Wu (Hao) practice sets reveals their origin with the Wu/Li family of gentry scholars who cultivated this art among themselves while leading their community through difficult times, and is also a central example of the important contributions of Hao Weizhen.

Notes

References

Bibliography
Chen, Gu'an (1985),   (Taiji Staff),  (Henan Science and Technology Publishing House), 

Chen, Gu'an (1988),  (Wu Style Taijiquan New Frame), (Henan Science and Technology Publishing House), 

Davis, Barbara (2004), The Taijiquan Classics, Blue Snake Books,  

Dong, Alex & Saltman, David (2017), Grand Master, Hudson River, 

Du, Yimin (1988), ( (Taiji Yin Wind Palm), ( (Huashan Literature and Art Publishing House), 

Hao, Shaoru, with 1963 introduction by Gu Liuxin (1963, reprinted 1984, Simplified character edition), ( (Wu Style Taijiquan), ( (People's Sports Publishing), UBC (PRC Unified Book Number) 7015•1190, 

Hao, Shaoru, with 1991 introduction by Hao Yinru (Simplified character edition, 1999),  (Wu Style Taijiquan),  (People's Sports Publishing), ; ((Traditional character edition, 2006),  (Wu Style Taijiquan),  (Dah Jaan Publishing Inc.), 

Kirkpatrick, Andy, and Xu, Zhichang (2012), Chinese Rhetoric and Writing: An Introduction for Language Teachers, The WAC Clearinghouse; Parlor Press, PDF  | ePub  | Paperback 

Li, Jianqing, Editor in Chief (2006),  (Yongnian Taijiquan Gazetteer),  (People's Sports Publishing House), .

Li, Yiyu (1881),  ("For Hao Weizhen to Cherish"), available online at Scribd and available in print in the 2016 Li Yiyu publication cited below.

Li Yiyu (2016),  ("Wang Zongyue Taijiquan Treatise"),  Beijing,  (Beijing Science and Technology Press), 

Liu, Jishun (2005) DVD, Wu (Hao) Tai Chi #1, DHM Productions

Liu, Jishun (2005) DVD, Wu (Hao) Tai Chi #2, DHM Productions

Liu, Jishun (2008), Hao Style Tai Ji Quan  (Chinese/English), Tin Wo Press & Publishing Co., Ltd., 

Liu, Jishun (2012), Secret Contents of Hao Weizhen Yi Qi Tai Ji Quan – Fundamental Skills' (Chinese/English)', Tin Wo Press & Publishing Co., Ltd., 

Smalheiser, Marvin, "A Little History on Hao Style", T'ai Chi, June 1985, Vol. 9, No. 3. Wayfarer Publications. 

Smalheiser, Marvin, (with Li, Pranda, trans.), "Liu Jishun: Wu/Hao Style Internal Methods", Tai Chi, June 1999, Vol. 23, No. 3. Wayfarer Publications. 

Smalheiser, Marvin, (with Peng, Youlian, trans.), "Wu Wenhan on Exploring Tai Chi History", Tai Chi, Winter/December 2009, Vol. 33, No. 4. Wayfarer Publications. 

Wile, Douglas (1983), T'ai-chi Touchstones: Yang Family Secret Transmissions, Sweet Ch'i Press, 

Wile, Douglas (1996), Lost T'ai-chi Classics from the Late Ch'ing Dynasty, State University of New York Press, 

Wu, Liuqun (1998),  (Hao Style Taijiquan),  (Hebei Science and Technology Press), 

Wu, Ta-yeh (1993), The Internal Training of Taijiquan, Palo Alto, CA. TTOPA.

Wu, Wenhan (2001),  (Wu Style Taijiquan Applications),  (Beijing Sports University Press), 

Wu, Wenhan (2009,  (Taijiquan Research Library),  (People's Sports Publishing House), 

Yao, Jizu (Simplified character edition, 1999),  (The Complete Book of Wu Style Taijiquan),  (Shanxi Science and Technology Publishing), ; ((Traditional character edition, 2010),  (The Complete Book of Wu Style Taijiquan),  (Dah Jaan Publishing Inc.), 

Yan, Hanxiu (Simplified character edition, 1996),  (Taijiquan Persons of Extraordinary Talent and Achievement),  (People's Sports Publishing), ; ((Traditional character edition, 2001),  (Taijiquan Persons of Extraordinary Talent and Achievement),  (Dah Jaan Publishing Inc.), 

Yang, Banhou (1875*),  (Explaining Taiji Principles), available online in Chinese and English translation at Scribd and also included in Chinese and English translation in Wile, Douglas (1996), Lost T'ai-chi Classics from the Late Ch'ing Dynasty, State University of New York Press,  (*Scholars estimate the publication date to be between 1875 and 1910, and believe the author(s) to be Yang Banhou and/or his disciples)

Yu, Gongbao (2006),   (China Taijiquan Dictionary),  (People's Sports Publishing House), 

Yu, Gongbao (2013),  (Dong Family Taiji: Dong Yingjie Taijiquan Tradition and Essentials),  (Contemporary China Publishing House), 

Zhai, Weichuan (Simplified character edition, 2006), 武式太极拳37式 (Wu Style Taijiquan 37 Form), 山西科学技术出版社 (Shanxi Science and Technology Press), ;  (Traditional character edition, 2014) 武式太極拳37式, 大展出版社有限公司 (Dah Jaan Publishing Inc.), 

Zhai, Weichuan (Simplified character edition, 2006), 武式太极拳小架 (Wu Style Taijiquan Small Frame), 山西科学技术出版社 (Shanxi Science and Technology Press), ; (Traditional character edition, 2015) 武式太極拳小架, 大展出版社有限公司 (Dah Jaan Publishing Inc.), 

Zhai, Weichuan (Simplified character edition, 2006), 武式太极拳老架 (Wu Style Taijiquan Old Frame), 山西科学技术出版社 (Shanxi Science and Technology Press), ; (Traditional character edition, 2015) 武式太極拳老架, 大展出版社有限公司 (Dah Jaan Publishing Inc.), 

Zhai, Weichuan (2006), 武式太极拳竞赛套路, (Wu Style Taijiquan Competition Form), 山西科学技术出版社 (Shanxi Science and Technology Press), 

Zhang, Shan (2014), The Competition Routine of Wu Style Taijiquan, Second Edition'' (English and Chinese edition), Shanxi Science and Technology Press,

External links
Web pages

Li family lineage: 
China Yong Nian Yu Xiang Tai Chi Chuan Institute
Wǔ 武 Tai Chi — Facebook

Hao family lineage:
Hao-Style Taijiquan, UK
Wu (Hao) Taiji Association of Silicon Valley
Liu Family Tui Na, San Diego area, California
Wu (Hao) Taichiquan Association, Thailand
Hao Style Taijiquan Research Institute, Singapore — Facebook

Li Shengduan lineage:
Wu Hao Tai Chi Chuan

Videos

Li family lineage:
Zhong Zhenshan performing the 108 form
WSTJDJX YouTube Channel
Wu Tai Chi YouTube Channel
TJQTN.com Wu Style videos (Chinese)

Hao family lineage:

Jon Thomas, Wu Hao Tai Chi (USA, San Diego area) — YouTube Channel
Hao Style Taijiquan Research Institute (UK / Singapore) — YouTube Channel
WuHaoTaiChi (Thailand), featuring Master Li Weiming — YouTube.com channel

Li Shengduan lineage:

Grandmaster Jimmy K. Wong — YouTube channel

Li Baoyu (Li Xiangyuan) lineage:

Master Yu Haishen performing the Hebei version in Renxian, Xingtai — YouKu.com

Master Hu Tianjun performing the Shanxi version in Nanhengshancun, in 3 variations at the 9-minute pace — YouKu.com

Master Alex Dong performing portions of the Dong family forms including the Hao Weizhen Kai He form

Tai chi styles